Martin Fabuš (born 11 November 1976, in Trenčín) is a Slovak footballer who plays as a striker for Slovakian 3. tier liga club MŠK Slovan Trenčianske Teplice. He had also played for Slovan Bratislava, Karlsruher SC, ASK Schwadorf and Ruch Chorzów. He played in the Czech Gambrinus liga for Sigma Olomouc. He spent most of his career playing for Trenčín, he reached his playing peak while playing under Stanislav Griga.

Achievements 
 the championship of Slovakia with Slovan Bratislava in 1995
 the championship of Slovakia with MŠK Žilina in 2003 and year later
 the winner of Slovak Cup with Dukla Bánska Bystrica in 2005
 the winner of Slovak Cup with FC ViOn Zlaté Moravce in 2007
 top-goalscorer of Slovak League in 1999 (19 goals) and in 2003 (12 goals)

References

1976 births
Living people
Sportspeople from Trenčín
Slovak footballers
Slovakia international footballers
Ruch Chorzów players
MŠK Žilina players
Karlsruher SC players
ŠK Slovan Bratislava players
Slovak Super Liga players
Czech First League players
SK Sigma Olomouc players
Ekstraklasa players
Slovak expatriate footballers
Expatriate footballers in Poland
Expatriate footballers in Germany
Expatriate footballers in the Czech Republic
Slovak expatriate sportspeople in Poland
AS Trenčín players
FK Dukla Banská Bystrica players
FC ViOn Zlaté Moravce players
Association football forwards